Bossiaea dasycarpa is a species of flowering plant in the family Fabaceae and is endemic to a small area in eastern Australia. It is a prostrate or low-lying shrub with narrow oblong to narrow elliptic leaves, and yellow and red flowers.

Description

Taxonomy and naming
Bossiaea dasycarpa was first formally described in 2012 by Ian R. Thompson in the journal Muelleria from specimens collected near Isis River in 1995. The specific epithet (dasycarpa) means "hairy fruit".

Distribution and habitat
This bossiaea grows in woodland and grassland from near Maryborough in Queensland to near Hillgrove in New South Wales.

References

dasycarpa
Flora of New South Wales
Flora of Victoria (Australia)
Plants described in 2012